The molecular formula C7H15Cl2N2O2P (molar mass: 261.09 g/mol, exact mass: 260.0248 u) may refer to:

 Ifosfamide (IFO)
 Cyclophosphamide (CP)

Molecular formulas